ERM Electronic Systems ltd. Aka ERM Advanced Telematics is an Israeli electronic company focused on the design, development, and manufacture of vehicle security and GPS tracking devices for the telematics and fleet management industry.
ERM Advanced Telematics has a global operation offering telematics devices for Stolen Vehicle Recovery (SVR) and Fleet Management Solutions (FMS), all incorporated within vehicle security.

As of June 2013, the company manufactured over 950,000 active devices worldwide. 

Since 2006, ERM is a subsidiary of Ituran Group (NASDAQ:ITRN).

16:02

Corporate history 
ERM Advanced Telematics was founded in May 1985 as ERM Electronic Systems ltd by Meir Hayman. The company was focused on the design and development of vehicle security systems and manufactured its devices using third party facilities.

1998  ERM moved to its new location in the west of Rishon LeZion where, for the first time, it launched its new SMT lines and since then all design, manufacturing and assembling is done in-house.

March 2000  Cellular network based M2M (Machine to Machine), being much cheaper and easy spread due to cellular providers efforts, made its tone and slowly conquered markets from the old RF. Soon, ERM began manufacturing its first line of telematics device  SkyLink.

September 2006  Ituran, being a public company, acquired 51% of ERM Electronic Systems and started moving all its new customers to GSM/GPS technology based on ERM's devices.

ERM then launched its new StarLink Family of Telematics products and started gaining new knowledge about automotive worldwide.

January 2013  ERM was re-branded as an international vendor for Telematics and Tracking technologies and changed its name to ERM Advanced Telematics.

April 2013  ERM releases its award-winning Safety technology for Driver Behavior monitoring and an internal Black Box functionality

December 2013  ERM launches its patented (US 8612137B2) Jamming Mitigation solution for the US and South America regions. The solution involves both hardware with cellular and proprietary RF communication and software methodology,

May 2014  ERM launches its Fuel monitoring technology

July 2014  ERM launches its first OBD solution requested by partner for Usage Based Insurance applications for insurance companies

March 2015  ERM launches its ERM India office in Bangalore (at 2019 moved to Delhi and Pune)

September 2016  ERM released its CANEngine technology for CANBUS monitoring and diagnostic, with set of supported products for non-intrusively CANBUS monitoring, CANBUS analysis, and additional customized valuable functionalities to create valuable information from CANBUS data

February 2017  Adding the forth SMT line

March 2017  ERM declares its Wireless Connect strategy which will allow its partners and customers wireless interface to various sensors and accessories.

August 2017  ERM launches its first Wi-Fi product which in parallel to cellular coverage can support several wireless technologies - long and short range

July 2019  ERM launches its AIS140 certified device for the Indian market

August 2019  ERM launches its first Electric Vehicle (EV) telematics product for Micro Mobility vehicles

October 2019  ERM launches its IoTLink family of Asset and IoT monitoring products which includes hardware and software solutions.

See also
Economy of Israel
Vehicle tracking system
Location-based service
Telematics

References

Economy of Israel
Global Positioning System
Science and technology in Israel
Wireless locating
Geographical technology
Companies listed on the Tel Aviv Stock Exchange